Zu Feng (born 23 February 1974) is a Chinese actor and director.

Zu first attracted attention in 2008 for his role as Li Ya in the successful TV drama Lurk.

He has earned and been nominated for numerous awards during his career, including winning the Best New Actor Award at the 2011 Chinese Young Generation Film Forum for his role in The Founding of a Party, Society Awardat the Golden Phoenix Awards, and two Huading Award for Best Supporting Actor.

Early life
Zu was born and raised in Nanjing, Jiangsu. He attended Jinling High School there.

In 1991, Zu worked in Nanjing Automobile Factory.

Zu enrolled in the Beijing Film Academy in 1996. He teaches there after graduation in 2000-2006.

Acting career
In 1999, Zu made his film debut in Lu Town Legend, when he was still a student at Beijing Film Academy.

While he was teaching at Beijing Film Academy he also appeared in many television series, such as The Highland Troop, The Silent Witness and Shajiabang.

In 2008, Zu won the Best Supporting Actor Award at the Huading Award for his performance in Lurk.

In 2011, Zu had a cameo appearance in The Founding of a Party, which earned him Best New Actor Award at the 2011 Chinese Young Generation Film Forum. He also won the Best Supporting Actor Award for his performance in Cheongsam.

In 2014, Zu co-starred with Chen Daoming and Gong Li in Coming Home, directed by Zhang Yimou and written by Yan Geling and Zou Jingzhi.

Personal life
In May 2010, Zu married Liu Tianchi, a teacher at Central Academy of Drama.

Filmography

Film

Television series

Awards

References

External links
 

Living people
1974 births
20th-century Chinese male actors
21st-century Chinese male actors
Chinese male film actors
Chinese male television actors
Male actors from Nanjing
Male actors from Jiangsu
Beijing Film Academy alumni